Scarlet GN, or C.I. Food Red 1, Ponceau SX, FD&C Red No. 4, or C.I. 14700 is a red azo dye once used as a food dye. As a food additive, it has the E number E125. It is usually used as a disodium salt.

In the United States, it is not permitted for use in food or ingested drugs and may only be used in externally applied drugs and cosmetics, due to potential carcinogenic effects from ingesting it. An exception was added in 1965 to allow its use in the coloring of maraschino cherries, which were considered mainly decorative and not a foodstuff. This exception was repealed in 1976 due to mounting safety concerns. In the European Union, it is not permitted as a food additive.

References 

Food colorings
Azo dyes
Sulfonates
Organic sodium salts
Acid dyes